Totok is an Indonesian term of Javanese origin, used in Indonesia to refer to recent migrants of Arab, Chinese or European origins. In the eighteenth and nineteenth centuries it was popularised among colonists in Batavia, who initially coined the term to describe the foreign born and new immigrants of "pure blood" – as opposed to people of mixed indigenous and foreign descent, such as the Peranakan Arabs, Chinese or Europeans (the latter being better known as the Indo people). 

When more pure-blooded Arabs, Chinese and Dutchmen were born in the East Indies, the term gained significance in describing those of exclusive or almost exclusive foreign ancestry.

'Peranakan' is the antonym of 'Totok', the former meaning simply 'descendants' (of mixed roots), and the latter meaning 'pure'.

Notable Dutch Totoks and descendants

  (Semarang, Java, 1922), founder of the North Sea Jazz festival
 Albert Alberts (1911–1995), award winning author, journalist
 Beb Bakhuys (1909–1982), football player and manager
 Ben Bot (born in Batavia) (b. 1937), minister
 Hans van den Broek (b. 1936), minister
 Jeroen Brouwers (1940-2022), author
 Conrad Busken Huet (1826–1886), newspaper editor on Java (1868–1876)
 Louis Couperus (1863–1923), childhood  in Batavia, Java (1871–1877), author of The Hidden Force (1900)
 P. A. Daum (1850–1898), newspaperman, author
 Johan Fabricius (1899–1981), author of De Scheepsjongens van Bontekoe (1923)
 Anthony Fokker (Blitar, Java, 1890–1939), aviation pioneer
 Hella Haasse (Batavia, Java, 1918–2011), award winning author
 Erik Hazelhoff Roelfzema (Surabaya, Java, 1917–2007), decorated World War II hero
 W. R. van Hoëvell (1812–1879), church minister of Batavia, political activist (1838–1848) 
 Xaviera Hollander (b. 1943), author
 Rudy Kousbroek (1929–2010), author
 Liesbeth List (b. 1941), singer
 Multatuli (1820–1887), resident on Ambon and Java (1838–1858), iconic author 
 , artist, singer
 Willem Oltmans (1925–2004), journalist, author
 Helga Ruebsamen (1934–2016), author
 F. Springer (1932–2011), author
 Bram van der Stok (Plaju, Sumatra, 1915–1993), decorated World War II hero 
 Madelon Szekely-Lulofs (Surabaya, 1899–1958) author of Rubber(1931) and Koelie (1931)
 Peter Tazelaar (Bukittingi, Sumatra, 1922–1993), decorated World War II hero
 Edgar Vos (Makassar, 1931-2010), fashion designer
 Margaretha Geertruida Zelle (1876–1917), known as Mata Hari, exotic dancer, spy

See also
 Afrikaner
 Indo people
 Indos in colonial history
 Indos in pre-colonial history

References

Citations

Bibliography
 Bosman, Ulbe and Raben, Remco. De oude Indische wereld 1500–1920. (Bert Bakker, Amsterdam 2003)  
 Sastrowardoyo, Subagio Sastra Hindia Belanda dan kita (Publisher: PT Balai Pustaka, Jakarta, 1990) p. 21  
 Taylor, Jean Gelman. The Social World of Batavia: European and Eurasian in Dutch Asia (Madison: The University of Wisconsin Press, 1983). 
 Taylor, Jean Gelman. Indonesia: Peoples and Histories (New Haven: Yale University Press, 2003).

External links
  Totok Hall of Fame website. Retrieved 13 Mar 2012.

Dutch diaspora in Asia
Dutch East Indies
Ethnic groups in Indonesia
Indonesian people of Dutch descent
Indonesian people of European descent